Tatsuya Kato (加藤 達也, Katō Tatsuya, born 1966) is a Japanese journalist who was a Seoul bureau chief of South Korea at Sankei Shimbun.

He was indicted in October 2014 on charges of defamation for reporting the relationship of President Park Geun-hye and Choi Soon-sil's husband, Chung Yoon-hoi,  by the Supreme Prosecutors' Office of the Republic of Korea after the MV Sewol sank. He was acquitted in December 2015 in what has been described as a small victory for freedom of the press in South Korea.

See also
 Censorship in South Korea 
 Freedom of the press in South Korea

References

Japanese journalists
1966 births
Living people
People from Tokyo
Komazawa University alumni
Free speech case law